The 1971–72 season was the 63rd year of football played by Dundee United, and covers the period from 1 July 1971 to 30 June 1972. United finished in ninth place in the First Division.

Match results
Dundee United played a total of 43 competitive matches during the 1971–72 season.

Legend

All results are written with Dundee United's score first.
Own goals in italics

First Division

Scottish Cup

League Cup

Texaco Cup

References

See also
 1971–72 in Scottish football

Dundee United F.C. seasons
Dundee United